The Best NHL Player ESPY Award has been presented annually since 1993 to the National Hockey League player, irrespective of nationality, adjudged to be the best in a given calendar year, typically most significantly in the NHL season contested during or immediately prior to the holding of the ESPY Awards ceremony.

Between 1993 and 2004, the award voting panel comprised variously fans, sportswriters, broadcasters, sports executives, and retired sportspersons, termed collectively experts; and retired sportspersons. Since then, balloting has been exclusively by fans over the Internet from among choices selected by the ESPN Select Nominating Committee.

Through the 2001 iteration of the ESPY Awards, ceremonies were conducted in February of each year to honor achievements over the previous calendar year; awards presented since then are conferred in June and reflect performance from the previous June.

Canadian centers Mario Lemieux and Sidney Crosby, wingers Jarome Iginla and Alexander Ovechkin, and Czech goaltender Dominik Hašek are the only players to have been honored multiple times; Lemieux, having captured the award three times, in 1993, 1994, and 1998, and Crosby having captured the award eight times, in 2007, 2008, 2009,  2010, 2013, 2014, 2016 and 2017.

Of the twenty-eight awards conferred, just eight have gone to players not from Canada: two to Hasek and one to countrymate Jaromír Jágr, three to Americans Tim Thomas, Jonathan Quick and Patrick Kane, and two to Russian Alexander Ovechkin. Just one has gone to a defenseman, in 2001 to Canadian Chris Pronger. There were no awards in 2005 due to the NHL lockout and in 2020 due to the COVID-19 pandemic.

Winners
 Player was a member of the winning team in the Stanley Cup Finals. Player was a member of the defeated team in the Stanley Cup Finals. * Hart Memorial Trophy winner† Conn Smythe Trophy winner

Notes
Because of the rescheduling of the ESPY Awards ceremony, the award presented in 2002 was given in consideration of performance between February 2001 and June 2002.

See also
Hart Memorial Trophy
Lester B. Pearson Award
Ice hockey trophies and awards
National Hockey League awards
Vezina Trophy

References

External links

ESPY Awards
National Hockey League trophies and awards